P. L. D. Premaratne was the 36th Solicitor General of Sri Lanka. He was appointed on 1994, succeeding Shibly Aziz, and held the office until 1996. He was succeeded by Upawansa Yapa.

References

P